Hao Mengling (1892–1937) was a Chinese general who distinguished himself first in the Northern Expedition and then in the Battle of Xinkou. Born on 18 February 1892 into a family of poor farmers, Hao ran away from his apprenticeship at a grocery shop to join the army when he was just a child. After he graduated from Baoding Military Academy, he joined Feng Yuxiang' Guominjun along with his mentor Wei Yisan (魏益三) in 1921. In 1926, he participated in the Northern Expedition as commanding officer of 26th Bde 4th Army, and his outstanding command earned him a promotion to CO of 2nd Division and then 54th Division. After the Central Plains War he was promoted to CO of 9th Army.

Hao relinquished his command in 1937 after battling communist forces for decades, but returned after the Marco Polo Bridge Incident. By the time he got back to the front line from Sichuan, the IJA had already broken through Yanmen Pass and were converging on Xinkou. Under Wei Lihuang's 14th Army Group, Hao led his 9th Army and Shanxi clique's 19th, 35th and 61st Armies in the defense of Xinkou.

During the battle, Hao's staff suggested to him to change to ordinary soldier's uniform for safety reasons, but Hao refused, a refusal that caused his death in the following battle.  After five days of intense battle that saw horrific casualties on both sides, Hao, who personally led a counter offensive, decided to survey the front, during which he had to reach another isolated section of Chinese controlled mountain ridge.  There were two trails, one was shorter and direct, but a stretch of 20 metres of this trail located at the front line and thus was exposed to the enemy fire.  Another trail was completely in Chinese control and out of reach of the enemy fire, but it would take much longer time to reach the destination if this path was taken.  Refusing his staff's suggestion for the same reason of boosting morale just like the way he had refused to change to ordinary soldier's uniform, Hao made a fateful decision to take the first trail and his entire staff followed in the hope of offering some protection in numbers so that enemy sniper would not be so easily picking out their commanding officer.  Everyone was betting on that the enemy often chose not bother to fire upon the Chinese soldiers dashing through the 20 metres stretch at the night based on the past experience.

During their 20 metres dash on the exposed trail, Hao and his staff were spotted by the enemy, who were able to clearly see that Hao was a general under the bright moonlight because of the reflection of metal stars and buttons of his uniform.  Instead of snipers, an enemy machine gun team 200 metres away immediately fired upon the Chinese, killing Hao and his entire staff, along with CO of 54th Division, Liu Jiaqi (刘家骐). Hao was the first army commander-level officer to die during the war, and his death, as well as other at that fateful night struck a serious blow to the Chinese defenders' morale.  With the most senior commanding officers and all of their staff killed, not only the planned counter offensive failed to materialize, the Chinese defense soon collapsed: the Chinese troops were driven from their positions on the very next day, and were forced to retreat further, but they did manage to stop the enemy at their newly established positions.

In recent Chinese movies portraying Hao's heroic action, Hao appeared as a strong built tough man character who were respected and even feared by his subordinates, which is far from the truth.  In reality, Hao was an extremely polite meek person who wore glasses, with an apparent nerdy look and his subordinates would not have hesitated to die for him not because of fear and respect, but out of love and admiration.

1892 births
1937 deaths
Military personnel of the Republic of China killed in the Second Sino-Japanese War
National Revolutionary Army generals from Hebei
People of the Northern Expedition
People of the Central Plains War
People from Shijiazhuang